Paul St. Clair Murphy (July 7, 1850 – November 9, 1931) was an American officer serving in the United States Marine Corps during the Spanish–American War. He was one of 23 men to be awarded the Marine Corps Brevet Medal.

Biography

Murphy was born July 7, 1850, in New York City, New York.

He joined the United States Marine Corps in 1873 and fought in several wars, including the Spanish–American War and World War I. In 1893 he commanded the Marine detachment that guarded the exhibits for the World's Columbian Exposition in Chicago, Illinois. The naval exhibit contained items that were loaned by the United States Department of State and other foreign governments for display.

In 1894 Commandant of the Marine Corps Colonel Heywood appointed Captain Murphy to lead the Marine Corps School of Application. Murphy started this assignment March 8, 1894 and on May 3, 1894, the school graduated its third class of officers and second class of noncommissioned officers.

On October 10, 1910, he retired as a colonel on his own request, but returned to active duty from April 1917 to June 1920 during World War I.

He died November 9, 1931, in Brooklyn, New York, and is buried in Evergreen Cemetery Brooklyn, New York.

Marine Corps Brevet Medal citation

Secretary of the Navy citation
Citation
The Secretary of the Navy takes pleasure in transmitting to Captain Paul St. Clair Murphy, United States Marine Corps, the Brevet Medal which is awarded in accordance with Marine Corps Order No. 26 (1921), for gallant service as Fleet Marine Officer, North Atlantic Fleet, in the naval battle of Santiago, Cuba, on 3 July 1898. On 10 August 1898, Captain Murphy is appointed Major, by brevet, to rank from 3 July 1898.

See also

References
General

 
 
 

Specific

External links
  Article
 Commandants

1850 births
1931 deaths
United States Marine Corps officers
Military personnel from New York City
American military personnel of the Spanish–American War
United States Marine Corps personnel of World War I